Edward A. Flynn (born 1948) is an American law enforcement executive. From 2008 until 2018, Flynn served as chief of the Milwaukee Police Department. Prior to assuming that position, he served as secretary of the Massachusetts Executive Office of Public Safety and Security and as police commissioner in Springfield, Massachusetts. Flynn was reappointed twice to the position of Milwaukee police chief before retiring in early 2018.

Early life and education
Flynn grew up in Brielle, New Jersey, the only child of Edward, a paralyzed World War II veteran who died when Flynn was 12, and Constance, who worked part-time at the local library. Flynn attended St. Catherine's School in nearby Spring Lake, then graduated from high school at Christian Brothers Academy in Lincroft in 1966.

Flynn earned a BA in history from La Salle University in 1970 and a master's degree in criminal justice from the John Jay College of Criminal Justice in 1976.

Career

Early career
After college he worked for the New Jersey Department of Public Welfare. In 1971, he joined the Hillside Township, New Jersey police department. From 1973 to 1988, he was a member of the Jersey City, New Jersey police department, rising to the rank of inspector.

From 1988 to 1993, he served as police chief of Braintree, Massachusetts. In Braintree, Flynn developed a reputation for using high-quality equipment. He was responsible for computerizing the department.

From 1993 to 1998, he was chief of police in Chelsea, Massachusetts. During his tenure, the police department adopted a community policing model, decentralized authority, recruited and promoted minorities, and encouraged inter-agency cooperation.

From 1998 to 2002, he served as police chief in Arlington County, Virginia, where he was responsible for leading the police department's responses to the September 11, 2001 attack on the Pentagon, and to the 2002 Beltway sniper shootings.

He returned to Massachusetts in January 2003, when then-governor Mitt Romney appointed him as secretary of the Massachusetts Executive Office of Public Safety and Security, the parent agency of the state police, department of correction, the National Guard, the department of fire services, office of the chief medical examiner, parole board, and the emergency management agency.

Flynn resigned from Romney's cabinet in March 2006, when he was appointed police commissioner in Springfield, Massachusetts. Eighteen months into his five-year contract there, Flynn became a finalist for the chief of police position in Milwaukee. He was criticized by elected officials in Springfield, including mayor Charles Ryan and city councilor and mayor-elect Domenic Sarno for seeking a job. Flynn was appointed Milwaukee chief of police on November 15, 2007, but remained in Springfield until the following January.

Milwaukee police chief 

Flynn was sworn in as Milwaukee police chief, on January 7, 2008. He was only the second outsider in the history of the Milwaukee Police Department to be named chief.

In late 2011 his contract was renewed for an additional four years, marking the first time since 1863 that a Milwaukee police chief was reappointed. He was credited with crime reductions every year of his tenure in Milwaukee, as well as mending police-citizen relations.

Flynn was reappointed by a unanimous decision of the city's Fire and Police Commission to a third four-year term in July 2015.

On January 8, 2018 Flynn announced his retirement as police chief effective February 16, 2018.

Controversies

Relationships with colleagues and lawmakers
In June 2011, Flynn criticized the state's proposed concealed-carry bill, saying that the bill did not provide enough supervision. In December 2011, Flynn and Milwaukee County sheriff David A. Clarke, Jr engaged in a war of words over bus safety in Milwaukee after an increase in the number of reports of fighting incidents on buses. Clarke also attacked Flynn for rising response times to crime and for bringing the culture of another area to Milwaukee.

Response to strip search complaints
In 2012, it was revealed that complaints were filed against seven Milwaukee police officers and a sergeant alleging that they performed unauthorized rectal searches during traffic stops. Flynn announced that all of them had been stripped of their police powers while the allegations were under investigation and urged citizens who felt that they had been subjected to an illegal strip search to come forward.

Crime statistics reporting
In May 2012, Wisconsin governor Scott Walker joined state and city officials in calling for an independent audit of Milwaukee police crime data, after a Milwaukee Journal Sentinel investigative report alleged that more than 500 cases of beatings, stabbings, and child abuse cases were mischaracterised in the city's violent crime rate data between 2009 and 2012, and so were misreported by the Milwaukee Police Department to the FBI as minor assaults. The errors in reporting, if substantiated, would have forced a change to the claim by Flynn of a decrease in violent crime in 2011 (by 2.3%), to an increase (by 1.1%).

McBride affair

In 2009, Flynn admitted to an affair with journalist Jessica McBride. In response to these allegations, he was quoted as saying "I have done my wife and family a great wrong, and I profoundly regret the hurt I have inflicted on them and others affected by my conduct [...]".

Initial claims by Daniel Bice of the Milwaukee Journal Sentinel (MJS)—who pens a "Watchdog column" covering Wisconsin government entitled "No Quarter"—that the affair was ongoing or coincident with a McBride story on the police chief have been rebutted by Milwaukee Magazine editor Bruce Murphy. Such coincidence would have implied conflict of interest, and so an issue of journalistic ethics, and Murphy, who edited the 5,400-word profile that McBride had written on Flynn, presented evidence to the contrary, and accused Bice of selective reporting of the facts of the Flynn-McBride case. Murphy, who terms Bice's MJS coverage of the Flynn-McBride affair a "hatchet job," further reports having removed negative content regarding Flynn from early drafts of the McBride piece (in order to shorten it), and otherwise argues that representation of the piece using terms such as "glowing" by Bice and other follow-on reporters since news of the affair broke is a misrepresentation—stating instead, of the McBride profile, that Although Flynn claimed that the affair had ended in 2009, the scandal reemerged briefly in July 2012 when a letter written by McBride's husband to Flynn's wife asserting a continuing affair was submitted to the City of Milwaukee, and was thereafter released to the press.

Personal life
Flynn and his wife Susan have been married since 1973. The couple has two grown children. Susan has remained in Virginia while Flynn has worked in Massachusetts and Wisconsin due to her career and desire to stay close to family.

Flynn was a 1996 National Institute of Justice Pickett Fellow at Harvard Kennedy School at Harvard University.

References

External links

}

1940s births
Living people
American police chiefs
Christian Brothers Academy (New Jersey) alumni
Massachusetts Secretaries of Public Safety
Chiefs of the Milwaukee Police Department
La Salle University alumni
John Jay College of Criminal Justice alumni
People from Brielle, New Jersey
People from Jersey City, New Jersey
People from Braintree, Massachusetts
People from Chelsea, Massachusetts
People from Springfield, Massachusetts
People from Arlington County, Virginia